Netaji Subhas Chandra Bose: The Forgotten Hero is a 2004 Indian epic biographical war film, written and directed by Shyam Benegal. The film starred an ensemble cast of Sachin Khedekar, Kulbhushan Kharbanda, Rajit Kapur, Arif Zakaria, and Divya Dutta, among others. The film depicts the life of the Indian Independence leader Subhas Chandra Bose in Nazi Germany: 1941–1943, and In Japanese-occupied Asia 1943–1945, and the events leading to the formation of Azad Hind Fauj.

The production design was helmed by Samir Chanda, with soundtrack, and background score by A. R. Rahman, Upon release, the film received wide critical acclaim at the BFI London Film Festival, and has garnered the National Film Award for Best Feature Film on National Integration, and the National Film Award for Best Production Design for that year. The film was screened retrospective on August 14, 2016 at the Independence Day Film Festival jointly presented by the Indian Directorate of Film Festivals and Ministry of Defence, commemorating 70th Indian Independence Day.

Plot
Set up in British Raj, after a political disagreement with Mahatma Gandhi, Bose's arrest and subsequent release sets the scene for his escape to Germany, via Afghanistan and the Soviet union. A few days before his escape, he sought solitude and, on this pretext, avoided meeting British guards and grew a beard. On the night of his escape, he dresses himself as a Pathan to avoid being identified. Bose escapes from under British surveillance at his house in Calcutta on 16 January 1941, accompanied by his nephew Sisir K. Bose in a car.

Bose journeys to Peshawar with the help of the Abwehr, where he was met by Akbar Shah and Bhagat Ram Talwar. Bose was taken to the home of Abad Khan, a trusted friend of Akbar Shah's. On 26 January 1941, Bose begins his journey to reach Russia through British India's North West frontier with Afghanistan. For this reason, he enlists the help of Mian Akbar Shah, then a Forward Bloc leader in the North-West Frontier Province. Shah had been out of India en route to the Soviet Union, and suggests a novel disguise for Bose to assume. Since Bose could not speak one word of Pashto, it would make him an easy target of Pashto speakers working for the British. For this reason, Shah suggests that Bose act deaf and dumb, and let his beard grow to mimic those of the tribesmen. Bose's guide Bhagat Ram Talwar, unknown to him, is actually a Soviet agent.

Supporters of the Aga Khan III help Bose across the border into Afghanistan where he was met by an Abwehr unit posing as a party of road construction engineers from the Organization Todt who then aided his passage across Afghanistan via Kabul to the border with Soviet Russia. After assuming the disguise of a Pashtun insurance agent ("Ziaudddin") to reach Afghanistan, Bose changes his disguise and travels to Moscow on the Italian passport of an Italian nobleman "Count Orlando Mazzotta". From Moscow, he reached Rome, and from there he travels to Germany. Once in Russia the NKVD transport Bose to Moscow where he hope that Russia's traditional enmity to British rule in India would result in support for his plans for a popular rising in India. However, Bose found the Soviets' response disappointing and was rapidly passed over to the German Ambassador in Moscow, Count von der Schulenburg. He had Bose flown on to Berlin in a special courier aircraft at the beginning of April where he was to receive a more favorable hearing from Joachim von Ribbentrop and the Foreign Ministry officials at the Wilhelmstrasse.

In Germany, Bose is attached to the Special Bureau for India under Adam von Trott zu Solz which was responsible for broadcasting on the German-sponsored Azad Hind Radio. Bose initiates the Free India Center in Berlin, and created the Indian Legion (consisting of some 4500 soldiers) out of Indian prisoners of war who had previously fought for the British in North Africa prior to their capture by Axis forces. The Indian Legion is attached to the Wehrmacht, and later transferred to the Waffen SS.

Its members swore the following allegiance to Hitler and Bose: "I swear by God this holy oath that I will obey the leader of the German race and state, Adolf Hitler, as the commander of the German armed forces in the fight for India, whose leader is Subhas Chandra Bose". This oath clearly abrogates control of the Indian legion to the German armed forces whilst stating Bose's overall leadership of India. He was also, however, prepared to envisage an invasion of India via the USSR by Nazi troops, spearheaded by the Azad Hind Legion; many question his judgment here, as it seems unlikely that the Germans could have been easily persuaded to leave after such an invasion, which might also have resulted in an Axis victory in the War.

In all, 3,000 Indian prisoners of war sign up for the Free India Legion. But instead of being delighted, Bose was worried. An admirer of Russia, he was devastated when Hitler's tanks rolled across the Soviet border. Matters were worsened by the fact that the now-retreating German army would be in no position to offer him help in driving the British from India. When he meets Hitler in May 1942, his suspicions were confirmed, and he comes to believe that the Nazi leader was more interested in using his men to win propaganda victories than military ones. So, in February 1943, Bose turned his back on his legionnaires and slipped secretly away aboard a submarine bound for Japan. This leaves the men he had recruited leaderless and demoralized in Germany.

Bose lives in Berlin from 1941 until 1943. During his earlier visit to Germany in 1934, he had met Emilie Schenkl, the daughter of an Austrian veterinarian whom he marries in 1937. Their daughter is Anita Bose Pfaff. In 1943, after being disillusioned that Germany could be of any help in gaining India's independence, he leaves for Japan. INA's special forces, the Bahadur Group, are extensively involved in operations behind enemy lines both during the diversionary attacks in Arakan, as well as the Japanese thrust towards Imphal and Kohima, along with the Burmese National Army led by Ba Maw and Aung San.

However, the Japanese Navy remains in essential control of the island's administration. On the Indian mainland, an Indian Tricolor, modeled after that of the Indian National Congress, was raised for the first time in the town in Moirang, in Manipur, in north-eastern India. The towns of Kohima and Imphal were placed under siege by divisions of the Japanese, Burmese National Army and the Gandhi and Nehru Brigades of INA during the attempted invasion of India, also known as Operation U-GO. However, Commonwealth forces held both positions and then counter-attack, in the process inflicting serious losses on the besieging forces, which were then forced to retreat back into Burma.

When the Japanese were defeated at the battles of Kohima and Imphal, the Provisional Government's aim of establishing a base in mainland India was lost forever. The INA was forced to pull back, along with the retreating Japanese army, and fought in key battles against the British Indian Army in its Burma campaign, notable in Meiktilla, Mandalay, Pegu, Nyangyu and Mount Popa. However, with the fall of Rangoon, Bose's government ceases to be an effective political entity. A large proportion of the INA troops surrenders under Lt Col Loganathan. The remaining troops retreated with Bose towards Malaya or made for Thailand. Japan's surrender at the end of the war also leads to the eventual surrender of the Indian National Army, when the troops of the British Indian Army were repatriated to India. On 17 August 1945, Bose leaves from Saigon to Tourane, French Indo-China in the Mitsubishi Ki-21 twin-engine heavy bomber. Subsequently, on 23 August 1945, Reuters announces the death of Bose and General Tsunamasa Shidei of the Japanese Kwantung Army in Japanese-occupied Manchuria. The film ends with the INA trials at Red Fort, Indian Navy rebellion, and the resulting Indian Independence in 1947.

Cast

 Sachin Khedekar as Subhas Chandra Bose
Jisshu Sengupta as Sisir Bose
 Kulbhushan Kharbanda as Uttamchand Malhotra
 Rajit Kapur as Abid Hasan
 Divya Dutta as Ila Bose
 Arif Zakaria as Gurbaksh Singh Dhillon
 Ila Arun as Ranu
 Pankaj Berry as Abad Khan
 Narendra Jha as Raja Habib ur Rahman Khan
 Nicolas Chagrin as General Auchinlek
 Nandini Chatterjee as Meera
 Pradeep Kumar Das as Servant
 Chris England as CID Chief
 Arindham Ghosh as Subhas Chandra Bose's Cousin
 Ahmed Khan as Mian Akbar
 Shakeel Khan as Sarat Bose
 Howard Lee as Governor of Bengal—Sir John Arthur Herbert
 Kunal Mitra as Ashok Bose
 Samiran Mukherjee as Subhas Chandra Bose's Cousin
 Rohan Nicol as CID Officer
 Lal Babu Pandit as Checkpost Policeman
 Zakir Hussain as Shaukat Malik
 Mukul Nag
 Anna Prüstel as Emilie Schenkl
 Florian Panzner as Alexander Werth
 Surendra Rajan as Mahatma Gandhi
 Charu Rohatgi as Bivabati Devi
 Alokananda Roy as Prabhabati Bose
 Ashiesh Roy as Spy Police 2
 Sonu Sood as Lt. Col. Shah Nawaz Khan
 Vikrant Chaturvedi as Col. Prem Kumar Sahgal
 Rajeshwari Sachdev as Capt. Lakshmi Sehgal
 Udo Schenk as Adolf Hitler
 Bernd-Uwe Reppenhagen as Joachim von Ribbentrop
 Gen Seto as Ambassador Oshima
 Rakesh Shrivastav as Spy Police 1
 Arindam Sil as Jail Warden
 Sandeep Srivastava as Nambiar
 Lalit Tiwari as Checkpost Policeman
 Christian Willis as Jail Superintendent
 Dr.B.D. Mukherjee as Janakinath Bose
 Rajpal Yadav as Bhagat Ram Talwar
 Kelly Dorjee as the Prime Minister Tojo
 Manish Wadhwa as Captain Inayat Gyani
 Anup Shukla as Major Raturi

Reception 
Bose: The Forgotten Hero, which offered a controversial view of the life of Bose, sparked protest in India. Director Benegal was forced to cancel its premiere in Calcutta. The film was fiercely opposed by the Forward Bloc party. The party was angry at the film's suggestion that Bose secretly married an Austrian woman, Emilie Schenkl, in 1937, and that he died in a plane crash in Taiwan rather than fleeing to Russia in 1945 as some people believe.

BBC gave 3 stars out of 5 for Netaji Subhas Chandra Bose: The Forgotten Hero. Critic Jaspreet Pandohar called it "an informative and fascinating lesson worth sitting through" and "an absorbing drama." "Benegal is best known for his intimate portraits of Indian women, so it comes as some surprise that his latest film is a biopic of one of India's most famous male icons, Subhas Chandra Bose. Benegal ensures Bose's amazing but complex life story is peppered with just the right amount of detail so as to be easily understood. But what stops this film from becoming a [box-office] hit is its marathon length. At nearly three and a half hours, Sachin Khedekar's gallant performance isn't enough to make this a rousing affair," Pandohar wrote in his analysis.

Sachin Khedekar's portrayal of Bose was praised by critics including Ziya us-Salam of The Hindu newspaper. "Khedekar may not win too many international awards for portraying Bose but accolades in India should come in thick and fast," she wrote in her review. "Benegal may not have put together an epic to challenge the lasting greatness of "Gandhi," Richard Attenborough's tribute to our father of the nation. But nor has he had the advantage of such resources. Where Benegal deserves credit is not in the canvas of his work but the intellectual honesty he has brought to the film. He refrains from either diluting or distorting history to serve his ends." Salam also noted the limitations of a director working under a relatively small budget for a historical film.

Music

The highly acclaimed music score that accompanies the film was composed by A. R. Rahman. The soundtrack features 20 pieces composed by Rahman, including 12 instrumentals and orchestral themes, six songs with lyrics by Javed Akhtar and a full orchestral version of Indian National Anthem. Most of the score was conducted by Matt Dunkley and performed by Czech Philharmonic Orchestra. Performers include the Western Choir Chennai (for "Aazadi") and the Mumbai Film Choir ("Hum Dilli Dilli Jayenge").

Reception
The soundtrack got high critical acclaim. A. R. Rahman received unanimous positive appreciations for his work. Popular music reviewing website Planet Bollywood gave 10 out of 10 stating "Bose – The Forgotten Hero is one of A.R. Rahman's and Javed Akhtar's finest creations. It's [sic] lack of mainstream compatibility and item numbers may hinder it from topping tabloid music charts, but that is barely a price to pay for having the distinction of creating musical storytelling of such high caliber. With three creative geniuses (A.R. Rahman, Javed Akhtar, and Shyam Benegal) at work, this quality soundtrack promises a very exciting movie to watch out for." Another popular review website nowrunning gave a positive review stating "The entire album is created for a patriotic, period film and is totally different from the regular film albums that one hears nowadays. It is always a difficult task to write songs that can cause one's patriotism to surge and flow. To his credit, it must be said that Rahman has succeeded in this and is ably aided by some wonderful lyrics by Javed Saab. As usual, Rahman has used original compositions to enhance the value of original songs and words used by the Indian National Army, way back in the 40s. A good album, but one that may not get popular acclaim but will definitely appeal to a niche audience."

The soundtrack is considered one of Rahman's finest works and was particularly praised for grand orchestration.

Track listing

Awards
National Film Awards 2004
 Nargis Dutt Award for Best Feature Film on National Integration
 National Film Award for Best Art Direction: Samir Chanda

See also
 Indian National Army
 Azad Hind
 List of Asian historical drama films
 List of artistic depictions of Mahatma Gandhi

References

External links
 
 Bose: The Forgotten Hero at Allmovie

2004 films
2000s Hindi-language films
Indian war films
Films about intelligence agencies
Films directed by Shyam Benegal
Indian biographical films
Indian political films
Films set in the Indian independence movement
Memorials to Subhas Chandra Bose
Films with screenplays by Shama Zaidi
Films scored by A. R. Rahman
Indian Army in films
Films whose production designer won the Best Production Design National Film Award
Best Film on National Integration National Film Award winners
Indian National Army in fiction
Cultural depictions of Mahatma Gandhi
Cultural depictions of Hideki Tojo
Cultural depictions of Adolf Hitler
Films about Subhas Chandra Bose
Films shot in Uzbekistan
Indian World War II films